The following is the List of European Table Tennis Championships medalists.

Results of Individual Events 
The tables below are European Table Tennis Champions lists of individual events (Men's and Women's Singles, Men's and Women's Doubles and Mixed).

Men's singles

Women's singles

Men's doubles

Women's doubles

Mixed doubles

Results of Team Events 
The tables below are European Table Tennis Champions lists of teams events.

Men's team

Women's team

See also
European Table Tennis Championships

References

ITTF Statistics

Lists of table tennis players
Lists of sports medalists